Tokyo Bay is a novel by Anthony Grey. It portrays the historic events that follow when one US Navy officer decides to disobey orders and impulsively sets out to climb the great Mt. Fuji. His actions could onset a great war between two great nations. One nation, technically advanced. The other nation, the most bravest men regardless of their shortcomings during the 19th century.

The novel was published in 1996 by Pan Macmillan.

Plot

A fleet of smoking black ships steam past Japan’s tributary islands in July 1853, setting off panic among a people who have been sealed off from the rest of the world for over two hundred years. Commodore Matthew Perry has been sent by the US president to open Japan to American ships and trade—by force, if necessary. Navy lieutenant Robert Eden, an idealistic New Englander, immediately recognizes that the colonial intentions of his technologically advanced countrymen toward the feudal, sword-wielding samurai will ignite a violent conflict. Inspired to pursue peace, he jumps ship and finds himself plunged into an entirely new world of menacing warriors, distraught Japanese who view Americans as monsters, and ravishing geisha. All of Eden’s efforts are in the name of a lasting peace, but can he survive the cataclysmic clash of two strong cultures?

1996 novels
Novels set in Japan
Japan in non-Japanese culture